A list of notable buildings and structures in Guinea by city:

Conakry

Hospitals
Donka Hospital
Ignace Deen Hospital
Clinique Ambroise Paré
Clinique Pasteur

Hotels
Grand Hotel de l'Unite
Hotel Camayene
Hotel du Golfe
Hotel del Niger
Hôtel Océane
Hotel Petit Bateau
Hotel Le Rocher
Hotel le Sogue
Le Meridien Mariador Palace
Maison d Accueil
Novotel Grand Hotel de L'Independance, Conakry
Le Riviera Royal Hotel

Markets
Marché Madina
Marché du Niger

Palaces and museums
Casa de Belle Vue
Center Culturel Franco Guineen
Sandervalia National Museum
Palais de Nations
Presidential Palace
Palais du Peuple

Parks and gardens
Jardin 2 Octubre
Conakry Botanical Garden

Places of worship
Cathedrale Sainte-Marie
Paroisse Saint Michel
Grande Mosque Fayçal

Schools
College Gbessia Centre
College-Lycee Sainte-Marie
Gamal Abdel Nasser University (Institut Polytechnique de Conakry)
Institut Geographique National (Guinea)
Université Kofi Annan

Other
8 November Bridge
Camp Boiro
Conakry International Airport
Monument du 22 Novembre 1970
National Archives of Guinea
National Library of Guinea
Stade du 28 Septembre

Dalaba
Restaurant Hidalgo
Sib Hotel Fouta

Guéckédou
Guéckédou Hospital

Kankan

Hote de la Gare
Hotel Bate
Institut Polytechnique de Kankan
Kankan Airport
Julius Nyerere University of Kankan (Université de Kankan)
Kankan Kabada Health Centre

Kindia
Hotel Flamboyant
Kahere Eila Poultry Farming School
Kindia University

Kissidougou

Hotel Mandela
Hotel Mantise Palace
Hotel Savanah
Kissidougou Airport
Kissidougou Ethnology Museum
Kissidougou Hospital
Kissidougou Market

Koundara
Musée Fédérale Annexe de Koundara
Koundara Ethnology Museum

Labé
Hotel du Tourisme

Macenta
Hotel Bamala
Hotel Palm
Macenta Airport

Mamou
Hotel Baly
Mamou Market

Nzérékoré

Auberge Golo
Club Hanoi
Hospital Market Stadium
Hotel Bakoli
Hotel Haida
Hotel le Destin
Hotel Le Mont Nimba
Musee Ethnographique
L’Université de N’Zérékoré
Université du Developpement Communautaire
Nzérékoré Hospital
Nimba Market
Nzérékoré Mosque

References